Events in the year 1805 in India.

Incumbents
 Marquess Cornwallis, Governor-General, 1805 (also 1786–93, 1796–98)
 Sir George Barlow, 1st Baronet, Governor-General, 1805–07.

Events
 National income - 11,704 million
 Maratha Wars, 1802–05.

Law

References

 
India
Years of the 19th century in India